Erica Zaveta (born September 6, 1989) is an American professional racing cyclist who rides for Cylance Pro Cycling.

Major Results
2013
1st  Collegiate Division 2 National Cyclo-cross Championships

See also
 List of 2016 UCI Women's Teams and riders

References

External links
 

1989 births
Living people
American female cyclists
Place of birth missing (living people)
21st-century American women